Alvance Robinson (born May 13, 1983) is a former American football wide receiver. He played college football at Alabama State University, earning First Team All-Southwestern Athletic Conference in 2005. He was signed as a free agent by the Saskatchewan Roughriders in 2006. He is the current Wide Receivers Coach for the DC Defenders.

Coaching career 
Robinson was hired by the DC Defenders on September 13, 2022.

References

External links
 Philadelphia Soul Bio

1983 births
Living people
American football wide receivers
Alabama State Hornets football players
Lubbock Renegades players
South Georgia Wildcats players
Milwaukee Iron players
Oklahoma City Yard Dawgz players
Utah Blaze players
Philadelphia Soul players
Pittsburgh Power players
Portland Thunder players
Players of American football from Dayton, Ohio